Jorge "Jordi" Payá Rodríguez (born July 10, 1963 in Manresa, Catalonia) is a former water polo player from Spain, who was a member of the national team that won the gold medal at the 1996 Summer Olympics in Atlanta, Georgia. It was his second Olympic appearance, having made his debut in 1988 (Seoul).

See also
 Spain men's Olympic water polo team records and statistics
 List of Olympic champions in men's water polo
 List of Olympic medalists in water polo (men)
 List of World Aquatics Championships medalists in water polo

References
 Spanish Olympic Committee

External links
 

1963 births
Living people
Sportspeople from Manresa
Water polo players from Catalonia
Spanish male water polo players
Water polo centre forwards
Water polo players at the 1988 Summer Olympics
Water polo players at the 1996 Summer Olympics
Medalists at the 1996 Summer Olympics
Olympic gold medalists for Spain in water polo
20th-century Spanish people
Sportsmen from Catalonia